Grevillea florida is a species of flowering plant in the family Proteaceae and is endemic to the south-west of Western Australia. It is a erect, low shrub with linear to narrowly elliptic leaves,  and clusters of hairy, white to creamy yellow flowers with a yellow- or orange-tipped style that ages to red.

Description
The flowers are arranged in small groups, and are covered with white to creamy yellow hairs, the end of the style bright yellow or orange but turning red as the flowers age.

Taxonomy
This grevillea was first formally described in 1986 by Donald McGillivray who gave it the name Grevillea uncinulata subsp. florida in his book, New Names in Grevillea Proteaceae. In 2000, Robert Owen Makinson raised the subspecies to Grevillea florida in the Flora of Australia. The specific epithet (florida) means "flowery".

Distribution and habitat
Grevillea florida grows in heath, shrubland or shrubby woodland between Perth, Wannamal, New Norcia, Badgingarra and Yoting in the Geraldton Sandplains, Jarrah Forest and Swan Coastal Plain biogeographic regions of south-western Western Australia.

Conservation status
Grevillea florida is listed as "Priority Three" by the Government of Western Australia Department of Biodiversity, Conservation and Attractions, meaning that it is poorly known and known from only a few locations but is not under imminent threat.

See also
 List of Grevillea species

References

florida
Proteales of Australia
Eudicots of Western Australia
Taxa named by Donald McGillivray